Wyco Church, also known as Wyco Community Church, Wyco Independent Church, Wyco Freewill Baptist Church, and Wyco Independent Baptist Church, is a historic Baptist church located near Mullens, Wyoming County, West Virginia. It was built in 1917, and is a rectangular frame building with a front gable-roof and set a cut sandstone foundation. It is clad in wood clapboard and features lancet windows and a prominent, recessed entrance in the Late Gothic Revival style. It was constructed by Coal Baron Major W.T. Tam's carpenters for use by coal miners and their families at the Wyco coal town .

It was listed on the National Register of Historic Places in 2010.

References

Churches on the National Register of Historic Places in West Virginia
Baptist churches in West Virginia
Carpenter Gothic church buildings in West Virginia
Churches completed in 1917
20th-century Baptist churches in the United States
Buildings and structures in Wyoming County, West Virginia
National Register of Historic Places in Wyoming County, West Virginia